Aliyu Mai Sango Abubakar III was elected Senator for the Sokoto North constituency of Sokoto State, Nigeria at the start of the Nigerian Fourth Republic, running on the All People's Party (APP) platform. He took office on 29 May 1999.
After taking his seat in the Senate in June 1999, he was appointed to committees on Ethics, Security & Intelligence, Judiciary (vice chairman), Police Affairs and Drug & Narcotics.

References

Members of the Senate (Nigeria) from Sokoto State
Living people
All People's Party (Nigeria) politicians
Politicians from Sokoto State
20th-century Nigerian politicians
21st-century Nigerian politicians
Year of birth missing (living people)